"Eisgekühlter Bommerlunder" (Bommerlunder On The Rocks) is a German drinking song by the group Die Toten Hosen. The song is repeated over and over, each time the song is sung quicker and a pitch higher, until performers can not sing anymore.

Bommerlunder is a brand of schnapps, popular in Northern Germany.

Song

Die Toten Hosen released the song as a double A-side single with "Opel-Gang" in 1983, although the single is mostly referred to as "Eisgekühlter Bommerlunder". The single was released with a tiny bottle of Bommerlunder included in the packaging. The single version of "Opel-Gang" is a bit different from the version released on Opel-Gang. "Eisgekühlter Bommerlunder" was not originally released on any albums, but the song was released later on the 1993 best-of album Reich & sexy.

In the same year, they produced a hip hop version  of "Eisgekühlter Bommerlunder" together with Fab Five Freddy, called "Hip Hop Bommi Bop".

Music video
The video for "Eisgekühlter Bommerlunder" was directed by Wolfgang Büld. It shows a wedding in a church turn into total chaos, partly caused by drinking Bommerlunder.

Track listing
 "Eisgekühlter Bommerlunder" (Molinare, Dt.Spez.; Trimpop/Trimpop) − 2:58
 "Opel-Gang" (von Holst, Frege/Breitkopf, Frege, von Holst, Meurer, Trimpop) − 1:59
 "Armee der Verlierer" (Army of losers) (Frege, von Holst/Frege) − 4:23

Cover versions / Other versions
Eisgekühlter Bommerlunder was sporadically covered as a party song.

In 1993, for example, the electro musician Tommi Stumpff and Luc Van Leuven released a techno version of the song entitled Bommerlunder as a maxi single under the name Die Technodosen.

References

Drinking songs
German songs
Die Toten Hosen songs